Kurt Kvarnström, born 1948, is a Swedish social democratic politician who has been a member of the Riksdag since 2002.

References
Kurt Kvarnström (S)

1948 births
Living people
Members of the Riksdag from the Social Democrats
Members of the Riksdag 2002–2006
Place of birth missing (living people)
Date of birth missing (living people)
21st-century Swedish politicians